Anything Goes! is the second album by the US dance group C+C Music Factory. The album's lead single "Do You Wanna Get Funky"; which featured Martha Wash, Zelma Davis, and Trilogy, reached number 1 on the Dance/Club Play charts, number 40 on the Hot 100, and number 11 on the R&B Singles chart. The follow-up single, "Take a Toke" reached number 23 on the Dance/Club Play and 48 on the R&B Singles chart.

The album's third single, "I Found Love", features a sample of Kool & The Gang's "Ladies' Night". "Just Wanna Chill" samples R. Kelly's  "Honey Love".

Track listing
 "Let's Get Started" (Interlude I)
 "Bounce to the Beat (Can You Dig It?)"
 "Do You Wanna Get Funky" (featuring Martha Wash, Zelma Davis, and Trilogy)
 "I Found Love" (featuring Zelma Davis)
 "A Song Is Just a Song" (Interlude II)
 "Takin' Over" (featuring Martha Wash)
 "Gonna Love U Over"
 "The Mood" (Interlude III)
 "Just Wanna Chill"
 "Take a Toke"
 "All Damn Night"
 "Share That Beat of Love"
 "Hip Hop Express"
 "Robi-Rob's Boriqua Anthem"
 "C+C Has Left the Building" (Interlude IV)
 "The West" (Interlude V)
 "Good or Bad" (Interlude VI)
 "A Moment of Silence for Larry Levan"
 "A Moment of Silence for Chep Nunez"
 "Papermaker" feat Mc Charlie Brown (AKA C Brown from L.o.n.s)

Personnel
 April Allen – background vocals
 Karen Anderson – background vocals
 Rodney Ascue – engineer
 Katreese Barnes – background vocals
 C+C Music Factory – primary artist
 Brian Chin – liner notes
 Clivillés & Cole – primary artist
 Robert Clivillés – arranger, backing vocals, composer, editing, mixing, producer, sequencing, vocals
 David Cole – arranger, backing vocals, composer, mixing, producer, vocals
 Deborah Cooper – vocals, backing vocals
 Jorge Corante – composer
 Ricky Crespo – composer, producer
 Stephen Cullo – producer
 Stephan Danelian – photography
 Zelma Davis – backing vocals, vocals
 Angel DeLeón – composer, vocals
 Craig Derry – backing vocals
 Will Downing – backing vocals
 Funkmaster Flex – producer
 El General – guest artist
 Andrea Hicks – backing vocals
 Kenny Hicks – vocal producer
 Chris Joannou – producer, programming
 Acar S. Key – engineer, mixing, producer
 Hal Belknap – assistant engineer
 Joey Kid – vocals
 Nicky Lindeman – art direction
 Paul Logus, Jr. – engineer
 Danny Madden – backing vocals
 Bruce Miller – engineer
 Cindy Mizelle – backing vocals
 Julian Peploe – design
 Herb Powers – mastering
 Duran Ramos – composer, producer, vocals
 Bob Rosa – engineer, mixing, producer
 John Seymour – assistant engineer
 Rod Temperton – composer
 Tony Terry – backing vocals
 Trilogy – vocals
 Danny Vargas – composer
 Martha Wash – vocals
 Albert Watson – photography
 Audrey Wheeler – vocals, backing vocals
 Larry Yasgar – executive producer

Charts

References

1994 albums
C+C Music Factory albums
Columbia Records albums
Albums produced by David Cole (record producer)